Yongmasan Station is a station on the Seoul Subway Line 7.

Station layout

Seoul Metropolitan Subway stations
Metro stations in Jungnang District
Railway stations opened in 1996